Benito may refer to:

Places
 Benito, Kentucky, United States
 Benito, Manitoba, Canada
 Benito River, a river in Equatorial Guinea

Other uses
 Benito (name)
 Benito (1993), an Italian film

See also
 Benito Cereno, a novella by Herman Melville
 Benito Juárez (disambiguation)
 Bonito, fish in the family Scombridae
 Don Benito, a town and municipality in Badajoz, Extremadura, Spain
 Olabiran Muyiwa (born 1998), Nigerian footballer known as Benito
 San Benito (disambiguation)